The Brexit withdrawal agreement Bill plan, officially known as Legislating for the Withdrawal Agreement between the United Kingdom and the European Union (Cm 9674), was a UK Government white paper setting out the Governments proposals for ratifying and implementing the Brexit withdrawal agreement in legislation.  

The plan would eventually lead to the European Union (Withdrawal Agreement) Act 2020 which received Royal Assent in January 2020 just before the United Kingdom left the European Union on 31 January 2020.

See also
2016 United Kingdom European Union membership referendum
Brexit
Brexit plan
Repeal Bill plan
Chequers plan

References 

2018 documents
2018 in international relations
2018 in the United Kingdom
Brexit-related agreements
White papers